Wild in the Country is a 1961 film starring Elvis Presley.

It may also refer to:
 "Wild in the Country" (Elvis Presley song), a song from the above-mentioned film
 Wild in the Country (festival), a music festival
 "Go Wild in the Country", a song by English band Bow Wow Wow.